Now to the Future is an album by FourPlay String Quartet. It is their third studio album, and features more originals and fewer covers than the previous two. Track 9, Bollyrock, fuses the styles of traditional Indian raga with a rock style.

Track listing

2006 albums
FourPlay String Quartet albums